Antonio Lopez may refer to:

Arts and entertainment
Antonio Lopez (illustrator) (1943–1987), American fashion illustrator
Antonio Lopez 1970: Sex Fashion & Disco, 2017 documentary film about the illustrator
Antonio López García (born 1936), Spanish realist painter and sculptor

Politicians
Antonio López de Ayala Velasco y Cardeñas, Count of Fuensalida (died 1709), Spanish nobleman and politician
Antonio López de Santa Anna (1794–1876), Mexican general at the Battle of the Alamo
Antonio López Muñoz, 1st Count of López Muñoz (1850–1929), Spanish nobleman and politician
Antonio López-Istúriz White (born 1970), Spanish politician
Antonio Xavier López Adame (born 1972), Mexican politician

Sportspeople
Antonio López Herranz (1913–1959), Spanish football player and manager
Antonio López (footballer, born 1957), Spanish football defender and manager
Antonio López Nieto (born 1958), Spanish football referee
Antonio López (footballer, born 1965), Spanish football forward
Antonio López (footballer, born 1980), Spanish football midfielder
Antonio López (footballer, born 1981), Spanish football left-back
Antonio López Ojeda (born May 1989), Mexican football forward
Antonio López (footballer, born September 1989), Spanish football defender
Antonio López (footballer, born 1997), Guatemalan football midfielder

Other
Antonio López, 1st Marquess of Comillas (1817–1883), founder and owner of the Compañía Transatlántica Española and Compañía General de Tabacos de Filipinas
Antonio López Portillo de Guadalupe (1679–1742), Mexican clergyman and bishop
Antonio Lopez-Fitzgerald, fictional character in the soap opera Passions
Antonio López (shipwreck), historic shipwreck of Spanish ship

See also
Tony Lopez (disambiguation)
Antony Lopez (disambiguation)